Bleibtreusee is a lake in Rhein-Erft-Kreis, North Rhine-Westphalia, Germany. At an elevation of its surface area is 37.8 ha. North of Bleibtreusee, there is an electricity pylon, which carried from 1977 to 2010 an observation deck.

Lakes of North Rhine-Westphalia